Debra Lee Hovey is a member of the Connecticut House of Representatives.

Biography
Hovey was born on July 15, 1954, in Houlton, Maine. She graduated from the University of Maine, the University of Hawaii at Manoa and the University of Texas at Austin (Educational Psychology/Curriculum for Young Gifted Children).

Career
Hovey was first elected to the Connecticut House of Representatives in 2002. She is a Republican.

References

People from Houlton, Maine
Republican Party members of the Connecticut House of Representatives
Women state legislators in Connecticut
University of Maine alumni
University of Hawaiʻi at Mānoa alumni
University of Texas at Austin College of Education alumni
1954 births
Living people
21st-century American women